This is a list of episodes from the television series Kodocha.

Episode list
first arc

second arc

References

Kodocha